Şenköy is a town in Hatay Province, Turkey.

The population was 1292 as of 2012.

Former name of Şenköy was Şeyhköy (village of sheik) referring to Sheik Ahmet Kuseyri who lived in the 16th century. According to nonconfirmed claims the sheik had been presented to Suleyman I (also known as Suleyman the Magnificent) and was given a zeamet ( a kind of fief) . The tomb of the sheik is next to the mosque built in the 16th century. After his death in 1549, his tomb became a pilgrimage center.

Between 1918 and 1938 Şenköy was under French Mandate.  In 1939 together with the rest of Hatay Republic it merged to Turkey.

The main product of the town is olive. There is also a small soap mill.

References 

Populated places in Hatay Province
Towns in Turkey
Yayladağ District